Bank Pocztowy SA is a commercial bank in Poland, offering financial services for individual customers with a complementary offering for micro and small enterprises using its network and facilities of the Polish Post.

In 1990 was the bank founded in Bydgoszcz. The idea behind its creation was to reactivate the traditional banking post in Poland. Shareholders of the bank are: Polish Post SA (75% minus 10 shares) and PKO BP (25% plus 10 shares). Bank Pocztowy has the largest bank network in Poland providing the financial services via the strategic partnership with its majority shareholders.

The number of current accounts for individual clients in the second quarter of 2016 amounted to approx. 863 thousand pieces. This gives the bank the 11th place in Poland.

In July 2017, it launched its Internet brand EnveloBank, which in 2021 was used to migrate customers to the new mobile and internet banking system.

Digital transformation of the Postal Bank 
The bank offers personal accounts "Accounts in order". Apple Pay, Google Pay, Xiaomi Pay, Garmin Pay are available for all cards. Detailed information is published on LinkedIn by the spokesman of Bank Pocztowy, Bartek Trzcinski.

Since December 2020, the Bank has pursued accelerated digital transformation and business model change  :

 - migration clients to the new online and mobile banking platform EnveloBank,
 - issued Mastercard cards to all its customers (in lieu of VISA cards),
 - implementation "a selfie" loan, 
 - first bank in Poland implemented a biometric card,
 - implemented virtual cards for holders of personal accounts, 
 - launched Microsoft's CRM Dynamics in the Azure cloud.
 - started cooperation with credit comparison websites 

Services in preparation [as of 2022.06.27]:

 - onboarding to a personal account (3Q 22), 
 - myID (1Q 23). 

According to the declarations of the Bank's representatives on internet forums - the Bank will finish work on BLIK on the phone by the end of 2022. The mobile application received high customer ratings 4.7 - July 2022 (Android)

Branch network (2022) 
Bank Pocztowy offers its services throughout the country. It has 132 points of contact (including 103 micro-branches (branches) located in post offices - as of 2022.07  . An important role is played by the network of Poczta Polska, with over 4,700 points, where you can use the services and products of Bank Pocztowy. Within its branches, it has 200 separate customer service points (PPD) with dedicated financial services (loans) and insurance employees - in total with the bank's micro-branches at the Post Office there is a network of 330 professional banking and insurance branches  .

References 
Article contains translated text from Bank Pocztowy on the Polish Wikipedia retrieved on 15 March 2017.

External links 

Profile on ECBS.org

Banks of Poland
Banks established in 1990
Polish companies established in 1990
Postal savings system